Mary Beth Norton (born 1943) is an American historian, specializing in American colonial history and well known for her work on women's history and the Salem witch trials. She is the Mary Donlon Alger Professor Emeritus of American History at the Department of History at Cornell University. Norton served as president of the American Historical Association in 2018. She is a recipient of the Ambassador Book Award in American Studies for In the Devil's Snare: The Salem Witchcraft Crisis of 1692. Norton received her Bachelor of Arts (B. A.) at the University of Michigan (1964). The next year she completed a Master of Arts (M. A.), going on to receive her Ph.D. in 1969 at Harvard University. She identifies as a Democrat and she considers herself a Methodist. Mary Beth Norton is a pioneer of women historians not only in the United States but also in the whole world, as she was the first woman to get a job in the department of history at Cornell University.

Biography
The historian Mary Beth Norton was born on March 25, 1943, in Ann Arbor, a city located in the state of Michigan. Her father, Clark Frederic, was a political science professor, a legislative assistant, and an employee for Congressional Research Services. Her mother, Mary Norton (her maiden name was Lunny), was also a professor. Her parents played a special role when encouraging her to study, as both of them were professors. In 1948, they left their hometown, Ann Arbor, and moved to Greencastle, a city in Indiana where both parents worked teaching in DePauw University. While her father was a political science professor, her mother taught Latin. She and her family were very tied to the academic year and to DePauw University.

As a kid, Norton became very interested in reading. She started at a very young age reading the adult section books of Greencastle public library, after having read all the ones located in the children's section. This is one of the reasons she took her first job as librarian of DePauw University, ensuring all the books were correctly organized. During her high school years, Norton felt she did not fit with the rest of her classmates, as she was the only student interested in books and history. Her parents got another position at the University of Michigan and she decided to do her undergraduate work there too. When she reached college, she met many other people with the same interests and got involved in national and campus politics.

In 1960, she openly campaigned for John Kennedy with the youth wing of the Democratic Party. In one of Kennedy's visits to Michigan, when he first came up with the Peace Corps, Norton was able to meet him personally. One curiosity was that, thanks to the students' support in Ann Arbor, Norton ́s hometown, Kennedy decided to make the Peace Corps one of his priorities during his campaign for the United States presidency. During her years at Michigan University, she held a seat on the Michigan Student Government Council, went to many congresses of the National Student Association (NSA) as a delegate and took part actively in the protest against nuclear testing and for the civil rights movement. The first time she experienced sex discrimination for being a woman was during her participation in the NSA, where male members would not allow her or other women to take leadership roles.

When applying to the Woodrow Wilson fellowship for graduate school, she was told by the professor at Michigan responsible for the applications that girls did not have many chances to obtain that fellowship. However, she decided to apply both to the Wilson and the Fulbright fellowships (the only two offered to women at that time) and face this sex discrimination. Against all odds, she obtained the Wilson fellowship, which brought her the opportunity to study four years at Harvard. She did much of her Ph.D. research in England, and in 1970 her work won the Allan Nevins prize from the Society of American Historians for the best-written dissertation. Two years later, it was published asThe British-Americans: The Loyalist Exiles in England, 1774-1789 by Little, Brown and Company.

After that, she was offered a job at the University of Connecticut as an assistant professor of history, a turning point in her acclaimed career. She spent two years there and got to know Tom Paterson, with whom she would later coauthor a new U.S. history textbook, the two-volume A People & A Nation, currently in its 11th edition. After reading Norton ́s published Ph.D. work, a teacher at Cornell University (New York) offered her a job as an American Revolution teacher, becoming the first woman in Cornell ́s history department.

In 1973 she took part in the first Berkshire Conference on the History of Women and since then the small group in charge, also called “Little Berks”, has grown into a bigger one with up to 60 members meeting every year. This Conference became a traditional three-year event which, startin with only 300 participants, now reaches more than 3000 participants from all over the world, including Mary Beth Norton in every single meeting. At the 6th conference in 1984, Norton co-chaired the event committee and published alongside her cochair the book “To Toil the Livelong Day:” American Women at Work, 1780-1980, containing 17 of the best papers from the conference. In 1974 she got promoted to associate professor of American history. She held this position until 1987 and since then she has been Mary Donlon Alger Professor of American History. She worked there teaching, managing her academic writings, and serving on the faculty senate, having been chosen by election twice to the Board of Trustees. Moreover, Cornell was the place where she started to take more interest in women's history. During her first year there, she took part in converting the small female studies program, of which graduate students were in charge, into one of the most successful in the United States. She also started to read and find out more about women in the United States history and she even came back to England to do research about the gender question in Loyalist claims, a subject about which she wrote in her first article on women's history. It was published in 1976 in the William and Mary Quarterly, a leading journal of American history and culture, and was the first step and inspiration to Liberty's Daughters: The Revolutionary Experience of American Women, 1750-1800, her first book. This book won her extremely positive reviews by many newspapers, including the ones written by Lawrence Stone, from the New York Times Book Review, and by Gerda Lerner, from the Washington Post Book World, who said "Norton's thoroughly researched evidence does not convincingly prove her thesis ... makes a valuable addition to our knowledge of the lives, thoughts and activities of women in the revolutionary era."

In 1985 the International Federation for Research in Women's History, whose current members come from more than 20 countries, was founded by Norton, among other people.

She also served as the general editor of the AHA Guide to Historical Literature in 1995.

Her book Founding Mothers & Fathers: Gendered Power and the Forming of American Society explains the gender and power differences between the 17th and the 18th century in New England and the Chesapeake and the deep analysis displayed in this book gave her in 1997 the finalist place for the Pulitzer prize in History.

Norton appears in a variety of history programs and documentaries about colonial times, including Salem Witch Trials in the Discovery Channel's Unsolved History series  in 2003 and in Witch Hunt on the History Channel in 2004. She was interviewed in 2008 for the PBS Series History Detectives, on Season 6, Episode 7, "Front Street Blockhouse.". She appeared in Salem Witch Hunt: Examine the Evidence in 2011 for the Essex National Heritage Commission and the National Park Service She made an appearance in the very first episode of the American version of Who Do You Think You Are?, helping Sarah Jessica Parker trace her Massachusetts ancestry, which involved the Salem witch trials. She also appeared, with historian Margo Burns, in Season 8 (2016) of the TLC genealogy show, speaking with actor Scott Foley about his ancestor, Samuel Wardwell, who was executed for witchcraft during the trials in 1692.

Memberships and Positions in Organizations 
Norton has served on the National Council on the Humanities, as president of the Berkshire Conference of Women Historians, and as vice president for research of the American Historical Association. She also served as the general editor of the AHA Guide to Historical Literature in 1995. Norton was elected a Fellow of the American Academy of Arts and Sciences in 1999. She was also elected Speaker of the third Cornell University Senate. Norton has won grants and fellowships from the National Endowment for the Humanities, the Guggenheim Foundation, and the Rockefeller Foundation.

Norton was elected as president-elect of the American Historical Association in summer 2016. She served as president-elect during calendar 2017 and as president in 2018.

She has also been a member of the Organization of American Historians, the Society of American Historians, the American Antiquarian Society, the Berkshire Conference of Women Historians, the Conference Group on Women's History, the Coordinating Committee of Women in the Historical Profession, the Phi Beta Kappa, the Mortar Board and the Phi Kappa Phi.

Works

The British-Americans: The Loyalist Exiles in England, 1774-1789, Little, Brown (Boston, MA), 1972.
(Editor, with Carol Berkin) Women of America: A History, Houghton Mifflin (Boston, MA), 1979.
(Coauthor) A People and a Nation: A History of the United States, Houghton Mifflin (Boston, MA), 1982, 6th revised edition, 2001, 6th brief edition, 2003.
(Editor, with Carol Groneman) "To Toil the Livelong Day": America's Women at Work, 1780-1980, Cornell University Press (Ithaca, NY), 1987.
(Editor, with Ruth M. Alexander) Major Problems in American Women's History: Documents and Essays, D. C. Heath (Lexington, MA), 1989, 3rd revised edition, Houghton Mifflin (Boston, MA), 2003.
(Editor, with Pamela Gerardi) The American Historical Association's Guide to Historical Literature, 3rd revised edition, Oxford University Press (New York, NY), 1995.

 1774: The Long Year of Revolution (2020) online review by Gordon S. Wood
Contributor to Women in the Age of the American Revolution, edited by Ronald Hoffman and Peter Albert, 1989; The Transformation of Early American History, edited by James Henretta, and others, 1991; and Learning History in America, edited by Lloyd Kramer, and others, 1994. Also contributor to History Today, William and Mary Quarterly, Signs, and many other journals.

Awards and honors 
Woodrow Wilson fellowship, 1964–65
Allan Nevins Prize of Society of American Historians for best doctoral dissertation in American history, 1969
National Endowment for the Humanities Younger Humanists fellowship, 1974–75
Charles Warren Center fellowship, Harvard University, 1974–75
Shelby Cullom Davic Center fellowship, Princeton University, 1977–78
Berkshire prize for Best Book, Woman Historian for Liberty's Daughters: The Revolutionary Experience of American Women, 1750–1800, 1980
Alice and Edith Hamilton Prize, 1980
Douglass Adair Prize, 1980
Berkshire Conference prize, 1981
Rockefeller Foundation fellow, 1986–87
Society for Humanities fellow, Cornell University, 1989–90
John Simon Guggenheim Memorial Foundation fellow, 1993-94

References

External links

1943 births
Living people
Cornell University Department of History faculty
University of Michigan alumni
Harvard University alumni
Historians of the American Revolution
Fellows of the American Academy of Arts and Sciences
American women historians
Writers from Ann Arbor, Michigan
Historians from Michigan
Women's historians